The Frente de Estudiantes Sindicalistas (FES) (English: Front of Syndicalist Students) was a Spanish student group belonging to the Falangist minority opposition to the Francoist regime.

Founded in 1963 in Madrid, the FES was led by Jorge Perales,  and José Real. Initially operating as the student arm of the Frente Nacional de Trabajadores (FNT; "National Front of Workers"), its mottos were Falange sí, Movimiento no ("Yes to Falange, No to Movement"); Falange sí, dictadura no ("Yes to Falange, no to dictatorship") and Por la reconstrucción de Falange ("For the re-building of Falange"). It eventually developed intense conflict with its matrix organization, the FNT, led by Narciso Perales, that transformed into the Revolutionary Syndicalist Front.

The FES was the seed of Falange Española Independiente (FEI).

Prime Minister of Spain José María Aznar, Audiencia Nacional judge Nicolás Poveda Peñas, Juan Fernández Krohn and Juan Diego were members of the organization.

References

Bibliography 
 
 
 
 

Falangism
Student organisations in Spain